Club Atlético Huracán, mostly known as Huracán de Comodoro Rivadavia is an Argentine Football club, located in the city of Comodoro Rivadavia, Chubut.

Torneo Nacional
The club played at the highest level of Argentine football on 3 occasions, when qualified to play in the National tournaments disputed on 1971, 1974 and 1976.

In 1971 Huracán finished at the bottom position of the table, after a poor campaign that set a record of:
Played: 14
Won: 1 – Tied: 1 – Lost: 12
Goals scored: 11
Goals received: 55
Total points: 3

In the Nacional 1974 Huracán finished 6th in a group of 9 teams. The most notable result of the season was a 4–0 win over their more illustrious namesakes Club Atlético Huracán from Buenos Aires.

The 1976 Nacional was Huracán's most successful campaign. The team finished 5th of 9, having achieved some notable results such as a 1–0 victory over Newell's Old Boys and a 4–0 win against Platense.

Team 2022 
Actually 11/december/2022

See also
List of football clubs in Argentina
Argentine football league system

External links

Official site

Football clubs in Chubut Province
Association football clubs established in 1927
1927 establishments in Argentina